Marc Fontecave (born 27 September 1956) is a French chemist. An international specialist in bioinorganic chemistry, he currently teaches at the Collège de France in Paris, where he heads the Laboratory of Chemistry of Biological Processes.

Biography 
Marc Fontecave is a graduate of the École normale supérieure de l'enseignement technique (which became the École normale supérieure Paris-Saclay in 2016), and holds a doctorate in science.

In 2005, he was elected a member of the French Academy of Sciences and in 2019 foreign member of the Royal Swedish Academy of Sciences. Since 2008–2009, he holds the Chair of Chemistry of Biological Processes at the Collège de France.

He chairs the Fondation du Collège de France and is a member of the EDF scientific council.

Research studies 
Marc Fontecave has deepened his understanding of the structure and reactivity of the metal centres present in metalloproteins. Its research can have applications in the fields of chemistry (selective catalysts), health (anti-cancer, antioxidants), environment (bioremediation, green chemistry) and energy (hydrogen production and carbon dioxide transformation).

Awards and honours 
   2015: Chevalier of the Légion d'Honneur

   2011: Achille-Le-Bel Grand Prize of the Société Chimique de France

   2010: Chevalier of the Ordre National du Mérite

   2009: Sir Raman Chair of the Indian Academy of Sciences

   2005: Member of the French Academy of Sciences

   2005: Senior member of the Institut Universitaire de France (IUF)

   2004: CNRS Silver medal

   1996: Policart-Lacassagne Prize of the French Academy of Sciences

   1991–1996: Junior member of IUF.

Position statements 
He intervened in the public debate to encourage public reappropriation of major scientific research and simplification of the French research system; according to him, the evaluation of researchers a posteriori is the only method for taking the necessary risks in research.

During the reflection on the energy transition, with his colleagues from the French Academy of Sciences, he encouraged the use of nuclear and shale gas. As the problem of storing and restoring intermittent renewable energies has not been solved, he criticizes the forced march towards energy transition. He argues that the intensification of nuclear use is a necessity to reduce CO2 emissions.

On 29 December 2018, he strongly criticised L'Affaire du siècle, a successful petition in a World Forum calling for the French State to be condemned for its failure to respect climate commitments, as "unfair, stupid, and ineffective".

Publication 
Chemistry of biological processes: an introduction, Paris, Éditions Fayard, "Collège de France" series, 2009, 60 p.

Article 
Ecology: "There is no chance of a revolution happening "2 on lemonde.fr on 3 September 2018

References 

1956 births
20th-century French chemists
21st-century French chemists
Members of the French Academy of Sciences
French National Centre for Scientific Research awards
Academic staff of the Collège de France
Recipients of the Legion of Honour
Living people